Amy Compton-Phillips, M.D., (born December 3, 1963) is the President of Clinical Care for Providence St. Joseph Health. She is known for leading Providence St. Joseph's treatment of the first COVID-19 patient in the United States.

Education and career 
Compton-Phillips is responsible for clinical care outcomes delivered by the non-profit health system that spans seven states and consists of 51 hospitals, over 800 clinics, and more than 115,000 caregivers. 
Compton-Phillips holds a bachelor's degree from Johns Hopkins University and a medical degree from the University of Maryland School of Medicine. Compton-Phillips is also a board-certified internist. Compton-Phillips currently chairs the High Value Healthcare Collaborative and serves on the boards of the Healthcare Information and Management Systems Society, Wellcare, Lumedic, the Institute of Systems Biology, and Multiscale Health Networks.

In the news 
Prior to the pandemic, Compton-Phillips was an active speaker about data use in healthcare and regular contributor to New England Journal of Medicine's Catalyst. She was featured in PBS Frontline's documentary, Coronavirus Pandemic, for leading Providence St. Joseph Health's treatment of the first COVID-19 patient. Compton-Phillips has since been recognized for speaking often about Providence St. Joseph's digital solutions to treat COVID-19. She was recently named one of 2020's top 30 healthcare IT influencers in CDW's HealthTech magazine, featured by Fierce Healthcare as one of their Women of Influence in 2020, and named one of Modern Healthcare's Top 25 Women Leaders in 2021. Compton-Phillips is also a CNN Medical Analyst and regularly shares medical information about COVID-19 with the public

References 

American women physicians
Living people
University of Maryland School of Medicine alumni
Johns Hopkins University alumni
1963 births
21st-century American women